Temptation is the seventh studio album by American singer Brenda K. Starr. It was released on March 26, 2002 on Sony Discos.

The album featured four singles, "Por Ese Hombre," the title track, "Gato Bajo La Lluvia," and "Rabia." The lead single peaked at number eleven on the Billboard Hot Latin Tracks chart and number one on the Billboard Tropical/Salsa Airplay chart, leading the latter chart for eight consecutive weeks in 2002.

The album reached the top thirty of the Billboard Top Latin Albums chart and number three on the Billboard Tropical/Salsa Albums chart.

Background
Starr had received several record deal offers including one from Universal Music Latino, opting to sign with Sony Discos. Production for the album took place in late 2001 in Miami and in Puerto Rico. While choosing songs to record for the album, Starr decided upon songs she felt would showcase her growth and potential as an artist. She wanted to record songs from an array of diverse musical genres.

Critical reception
At the Latin Billboard Music Awards of 2003, the album spawned awards for "Hot Latin Track of the Year, Vocal Duo" and "Tropical/Salsa Airplay Track of the Year, Female," both for "Por Ese Hombre." The album received a nomination for "Tropical/Salsa Album of the Year, Female."

Track listing

Charts

Weekly charts

Year-end charts

Personnel

N. Amador - Assistant Engineer
Gustavo Arenas - Arranger, Keyboards
Eddie Love Arroyo - Arranger, Producer, Vocal Arrangement
Richard Bravo - Percussion
Ed Calle - Horn, Saxophone
Jason Carder - Trumpet
Oskar Cartaya - Bass
Luis Columna - Arranger, Producer, Vocal Arrangement
Tony Concepcion - Trumpet
Mike Couzzi	 - Mixing
Sal Cuevas - Bass
Rafael "Tito" DeGracia - Timbales
Gerard Dure	 - Hair Stylist
Jose Luis Estrada - Engineer
Jorge Fonseca - A&R, Engineer
Carlos Franco - Guitar
Sammy García - Conga
Jose Gazmey - A&R, Concept, Producer, Vocal Director
J.B. Hernandez - Bass
Alejandro Jaén - Producer
Bert Keyes - Composer
Carlos Laurenz - Engineer
Oscar Llord	- Concept, Executive Producer
Angel Lopez	 - Vocals (Background)
Lunna - Vocals
Billy Mann - Programming, Vocals
Victor Manuelle - Performer
Lewis A. Martineé - Engineer
Aris Martinez	- Vocals (Background)
Vladimir Meller - Engineer
Miami Symphonic Orchestra - Strings
Raul Midón - Vocals
Dave Miranda	 - Vocals
Tito Nieves - Performer
Joel Numa - Engineer
Alfredo Oliva - Concertmaster
Javier Oquendo - Bongos
Richie Perez - Engineer
Rudy Pérez - Arranger, Guitar, Producer, Vocals
Clay Perry - Arranger, Keyboards, Programming
Cheito Quinonez - Vocals
Leo Quintero - Guitar (Acoustic)
Humberto Ramírez	- Arranger, Producer, Trumpet
Jose Luis Ramos - Vocals
Tony Rijos - Guitar
Miguel Rivera - Trombone
Héctor Ivan Rosa - Engineer
J. Salazar - Arranger
Martin Santiago - Bass
Simon Simantob - Assistant Engineer
Dana Teboe - Trombone
Ramiro Teran - Vocals
Richard Trinidad - Keyboards, Piano
Camilo Valencia - Brass Arrangement, Horn Arrangements
Victor Vazquez - Trombone
Jose "Che" Vega - Percussion
Eliud Velázquez - Percussion
Dan Warner - Guitar (Electric)
Bruce Weeden - Engineer, Mixing
Barry Yee - Photography

References

2002 albums
Brenda K. Starr albums
Sony Discos albums
Albums produced by Rudy Pérez